FC Fleury 91 is a French amateur association football club based in Fleury-Mérogis competing in the Championnat National 2.

In 2015 a petition was sent to mayor David Derroutet demanding adequate training space for the Under-19s and seniors. Consequently, the case was taken to court.

Ahead of the 2015–16 season, the club changed its name from US Fleury-Mérogis to Football Club Fleury 91.

References

External links
 Club profile at Soccerway

Football clubs in France
Association football clubs established in 1991
1991 establishments in France
Sport in Essonne
Football clubs in Île-de-France